"Once upon a time" is a stock phrase used to introduce a narrative of past events.

Once Upon a Time may also refer to:

Film 
 Donkey Skin (film), a 1970 French film also known in English as Once Upon a Time or The Magic Donkey
 Once Upon a Time (1918 film), a British silent romance directed by Thomas Bentley
 Once Upon a Time (1933 film), a French drama film
 Once Upon a Time (1944 film), an American fantasy starring Cary Grant
 Once Upon a Time (1973 film), a West German animated musical written and directed by Roberto Gavioli and Rolf Kauka
 Once Upon a Time (1995 film), a Thai drama
 Once Upon a Time (2008 film), a South Korean heist comedy
 Once Upon a Time (2013 film), an Indian Malayalam animated film directed by Binu Sasidharan
 Once Upon a Time (2017 Chinese film), a Chinese romantic drama
 Once Upon a Time (2017 Russian film), a Russian comedy-drama film
 Windaria, a 1986 Japanese anime film also known in English as Once Upon a Time or Legend of Fabulous Battle Windaria

Television 
 Once Upon a Time (TV series), a 2011 American fantasy drama
 Once Upon a Time in Wonderland, a spin-off of Once Upon a Time
 Once Upon a Time..., a French educational animation franchise
 Once Upon a Time... Man, in 1978
 Once Upon a Time... Space, in 1982
 Once Upon a Time... Life, in 1987
 Once Upon a Time... The Americas, in 1991
 Once Upon a Time... The Discoverers, in 1994
 Once Upon a Time... The Explorers, in 1996
 Once Upon a Time... Planet Earth, in 2008
 Once Upon a Time, Granada TV series from 1979–1983, featuring Peter Davison
 "Once Upon a Time" (The Prisoner), a 1968 episode of the allegorical science-fiction series The Prisoner
 "Once Upon a Time" (The Twilight Zone), a 1961 episode of the anthology series The Twilight Zone
 "Once Upon a Time", a 1995 television special of the PBS show Shining Time Station
 "Once Upon a Time" (Star Trek: Voyager), a 1998 episode of the science-fiction series Star Trek: Voyager
 "Once Upon a Time" (Charmed), a 2000 episode of the fantasy series Charmed
 "Once Upon a Time...", a 2011 episode of the drama series Dexter
 Wansapanataym (Filipinization of the phrase, "once upon a time"), a Philippine fantasy anthology

Literature
 Once Upon a Time (Fabbri Publishing), a collection of audio Fairy Tales published by Fabbri
 Once Upon a Time (novel series), a series of novels by Simon Pulse
 Once Upon a Time (poem), a poem by Nigerian writer Gabriel Okara

Music

Albums
 Once Upon a Time (The Lettermen album), 1962
 Once Upon a Time (Earl Hines album), 1966
 Once Upon a Time (The Kingston Trio album), 1969
 Once Upon a Time (Donna Summer album), 1977
 Once Upon a Time: The Singles, a 1981 album by Siouxsie and the Banshees
 Once Upon a Time (Simple Minds album), 1985
 Once Upon a Time (Marty Stuart album), 1992
 Once Upon a Time (Liverpool Express album), 2003
 Once Upon a Time (Dreadzone album), 2005
 Once Upon a Time (S.H.E album), 2005
 Once Upon a Time (Tiwa Savage album), 2013
 Once Upon a Time, a 2001 album by Claudia Christian

EPs
 Once Upon a Time (EP), a 2019 EP by Lovelyz
 Once Upon a Time, a 1993 EP by Jadis
 Once Upon a Time, a 2000 EP by Kahimi Karie
 Once Upon a Time, a 2021 EP by Chika

Songs
 "Once Upon a Time", List of songs written by Cole Porter
 "Once Upon a Time" (Air song), from the 2007 album Pocket Symphony
 "Once Upon a Time" (Charles Strouse and Lee Adams song), from the 1962 musical All American
 "Once Upon a Time", by Donna Summer from the 1977 album Once Upon a Time
 "Once Upon a Time", by Kamelot from their 2010 album Poetry for the Poisoned
 "Once Upon a Time" (Jimmy Johnson song) recorded by Rochell & the Candles
 "Once Upon a Time" (Marvin Gaye and Mary Wells song), from the 1964 duet album Together
 "Once Upon a Time" (The Pogues song), from the 1993 album Waiting for Herb
 "Once Upon a Time", by Simple Minds from the 1985 Once Upon a Time album
 "Once Upon a Time", by the Smashing Pumpkins from the 1998 album Adore
 "Once Upon a Time", by Toby Fox from the soundtrack of the 2015 video game Undertale
 "Once Upon a Time", by the Vels from the 1986 album House of Miracles

Other uses 
 Once Upon a Time (Disney parks), a U.S.–Japan video projection show
 Once Upon a Time (Devon theme park), a former attraction in England, UK
 Once Upon a Time (game), a family, storytelling-themed card game
 "Once Upon a Time", a painting series by Johannes Heisig

See also 
 Once on a Time, a 1917 novel by A. A. Milne
 Once Upon a Time in the West, 1968 Western film by Sergio Leone
 Once Upon a Time in America, 1984 epic crime drama film by Sergio Leone
 Once Upon a Time in Anatolia, 2011 Turkish film by Nuri Bilge Ceylan
 Once Upon a Time in Shaolin, 2015 album by Wu-Tang Clan
 Once upon a Time, a 1989 short story by Nadine Gordimer
 Once Upon a Time in Mesopotamia, 1998 French documentary film
 Once Upon a Time in Hollywood, 2019 film by Quentin Tarantino
 
 
 Twice Upon a Time (disambiguation)
 Thrice Upon a Time